In 2012 the foremost competition in athletics was the 2012 Summer Olympics in London. The International Association of Athletics Federations held four other global level competitions in 2012: the 2012 IAAF World Indoor Championships, 2012 IAAF World Race Walking Cup, 2012 World Junior Championships in Athletics and the 2012 IAAF World Half Marathon Championships.

For the first time since 1945, there was no global level championship for cross country running, as the IAAF World Cross Country Championships moved to a biennial format. Three of the major continental championships were held a month prior to the London Olympics: the 2012 African Championships in Athletics, 2012 European Athletics Championships and 2012 Oceania Athletics Championships.

The Diamond League entered its third year as the foremost seasonal track and field series.

Major events

World

Olympic Games
World Indoor Championships
World Race Walking Cup
World Half Marathon Championships
Diamond League
Paralympic Games
World Junior Championships
World Mountain Running Championships
WMA World Masters Indoor Championships
FISU Cross Country Championships
IAU 24 Hour World Championships
IAU 100 km World Championships

Regional

African Championships
African Cross Country Championships
Asian Indoor Championships
Asian Junior Championships
Asian Cross Country Championships
Asian Race Walking Championships
Oceania Athletics Championships
European Athletics Championships
European Cross Country Championships
European Cup Winter Throwing
European Mountain Running Championships
Ibero-American Championships
NACAC Cross Country Championships
NACAC Under-23 Championships
CAC Junior Championships
CARIFTA Games
South American U23 Championships
South American Youth Championships
South American Cross Country Championships

Marathons

 Boston Marathon
 London Marathon
 Berlin Marathon
 Chicago Marathon

World records

Men

Women

Notes

Season's bests

† = Russia's Darya Pishchalnikova had a throw of  70.69 m, but was annulled after she later failed a drug test.

Awards

Men

Women

References

Athletics (track and field) by year